Hely Domingo Ollarves Arias (born July 17, 1981 in Caracas) is a male track and field athlete from Venezuela. He competed in the men's 4x100 metres relay at the 2000 Summer Olympics in Sydney, Australia, where he was eliminated in the first round alongside José Carabalí, Juan Morillo, and José Peña.

Achievements

References

1981 births
Living people
Sportspeople from Caracas
Venezuelan male sprinters
Athletes (track and field) at the 2000 Summer Olympics
Olympic athletes of Venezuela
Central American and Caribbean Games silver medalists for Venezuela
Competitors at the 2002 Central American and Caribbean Games
World Athletics Championships athletes for Venezuela
Central American and Caribbean Games medalists in athletics
20th-century Venezuelan people
21st-century Venezuelan people